Narahara (written:  or ) is a Japanese surname. Notable people with the surname include:

, Japanese baseball player
, Japanese photographer
, Japanese politician
, Japanese table tennis player

Japanese-language surnames